DEJ may stand for:
Dermoepidermal junction, the interface between the dermis and the epidermis inside the skin
Dentinoenamel junction, the interface between the dentin and the enamel inside a tooth
Deferred entry of judgment, similar or equal to deferred adjudication in court cases

See also
Dej, a city in Romania